Aleksandra Urbańczyk-Olejarczyk (born 13 November 1987) is a Polish swimmer. She competed in the women's 4 × 100 metre freestyle relay event at the 2016 Summer Olympics.

References

External links
 

1987 births
Living people
Polish female backstroke swimmers
Olympic swimmers of Poland
Swimmers at the 2016 Summer Olympics
Sportspeople from Łódź
Polish female freestyle swimmers
Polish female medley swimmers
20th-century Polish women
21st-century Polish women